The olive-backed tailorbird (Orthotomus sepium) is a species of passerine bird formerly placed in the "Old World warbler" assemblage, it but now placed in the family Cisticolidae.

It is endemic to the islands of Java, Madura Island, Bali and Lombok.

References

olive-backed tailorbird
Birds of Java
Birds of Bali
Birds of Lombok
olive-backed tailorbird
Taxonomy articles created by Polbot